"Your Man" is a song by Canadian group Down with Webster. It was the second single released from the band's 2009 EP, Time to Win, Vol. 1. The song was very successful in Canada, peaking at number 12 on the Canadian Hot 100. In April 2010, the song was certified Platinum by the CRIA in digital downloads. The song contains a sample of "Girls It Ain't Easy" by Honey Cone. It has become the band's signature song and most successful to date.

Background
"Your Man" was written by Ronald Dunbar and Edyth Wayne and Down with Webster members Patrick Gillet, Tyler Armes, Cameron Hunter, Andrew Martino and Martin Seja. It was produced by Down With Webster and James Robertson and co-produced by Demacio Castellon.

Music video
The music video for "Your Man" was shot in Toronto on February 25 and 26, 2010. It was directed by Aaron A. The video shows the band performing on a fake reality show called Your Man, whose set has retro-flower decorations like the old Dating Game. During the video, the show's host and audience watch as three of the band members go on separate dates. On YouTube/Vevo the music video for "Your Man" crossed one million views in fall 2010 after being posted on April 8, 2010. As of 2022, it has just over 4 million views on YouTube. 

The video debuted on the MuchMusic Countdown at number 8 in the week of March 25, 2010. It reached number one in the week of July 8, 2010.

Awards and nominations

Live performances
"Your Man" has been performed live by the band on many occasions since its release. Down with Webster performed the song at the 2010 MuchMusic Video Awards on June 20, 2010.

Chart performance
"Your Man" debuted at number 91 on the Canadian Hot 100 for the week of February 13, 2010, and peaked at number 12 for the week of April 24, 2010, higher than the band's first single, "Rich Girl$", which peaked at number 21. "Your Man" spent 29 weeks on the Canadian Hot 100. The song was ranked number 37 on the 2010 Canadian Hot 100 Year End Chart.

Charts

Weekly charts

Year-end charts

Certifications

References

External links

2009 songs
2010 singles
Down with Webster songs
Universal Motown Records singles
Music videos directed by Aaron A
Songs written by Ron Dunbar
Songs written by Holland–Dozier–Holland